Raisinghnagar Assembly constituency is one of constituencies of Rajasthan Legislative Assembly in the Ganganagar (Lok Sabha constituency).

Raisingnagar Constituency covers all voters from Raisinghnagar tehsil; part of Vijaynagar tehsil, which includes ILRC Vijaynagar (including Vijaynagar Municipal Board), ILRC Kunplee, ILRC 40 GB, ILRC 8STB, ILRC 12 GB; and part of Anupgarh tehsil, which includes ILRC Salempura and ILRC Banda Colony.

References

See also 
Member of the Legislative Assembly (India)

Sri Ganganagar district
Assembly constituencies of Rajasthan